Louis-Marie-Charles-Henri Mercier Dupaty (29 September 1771, in Bordeaux – 12 November 1825, in Paris)  was a French sculptor.

The eldest son of the magistrate Jean-Baptiste Mercier Dupaty and brother of the writer and académicien Emmanuel Mercier Dupaty, he was destined for the magistrature but preferred the arts. He studied in the atelier of François-Frédéric Lemot and obtained a  Premier Grand Prix in sculpture,  1799, with his Pericles visiting Anaxagoras. On his return from the French Academy in Rome he was named to the Institut de France, in 1816, then appointed a professor at the École des Beaux-Arts.

Works
 Portrait of Gen. Charles Victor Emmanuel Leclerc, (Salon of 1812), marble, standing figure over lifesize (Versailles);
 Venus Genetrix (1810), marble Jardin des Plantes, Paris;
 completed Antoine-Denis Chaudet's Infant Oedipus and Phorbas (1799), shown at the Salon of 1801, after Chaudet's death, in cooperation with Pierre Cartellier;
 Venus before Paris (1822), marble, over lifesize figure, Versailles
 Cadmus and the Dragon
 Dying Biblis changed into a Spring (1819), marble, Musée du Louvre
 Ajax defying the Gods
 Model for the equestrian monument to Louis XIII (1816), completed by Jean-Pierre Cortot for Place des Vosges and installed in 1825.
 Portrait bust of Vincent-Marie Viénot de Vaublanc, (1820), Dahesh Museum of Art.

Selected works

References

External links

19th-century French sculptors
French male sculptors
1771 births
1825 deaths
Artists from Bordeaux
Members of the Académie des beaux-arts
Prix de Rome for sculpture
Burials at Père Lachaise Cemetery
19th-century French male artists